The Gell-Mann and Low theorem is a theorem in quantum field theory that allows one to relate the ground (or vacuum) state of an interacting system to the ground state of the corresponding non-interacting theory. It was proved in 1951 by Murray Gell-Mann and Francis E. Low. The theorem is useful because, among other things, by relating the ground state of the interacting theory to its non-interacting ground state, it allows one to express Green's functions (which are defined as expectation values of Heisenberg-picture fields in the interacting vacuum) as expectation values of interaction picture fields in the non-interacting vacuum. While typically applied to the ground state, the Gell-Mann and Low theorem applies to any eigenstate of the Hamiltonian. Its proof relies on the concept of starting with a non-interacting Hamiltonian and adiabatically switching on the interactions.

History 

The theorem was proved first by Gell-Mann and Low in 1951, making use of the Dyson series. In 1969, Klaus Hepp provided an alternative derivation for the case where the original Hamiltonian describes free particles and the interaction is norm bounded. In 1989, G. Nenciu and G. Rasche proved it using the adiabatic theorem. A proof that does not rely on the Dyson expansion was given in 2007 by Luca Guido Molinari.

Statement of the theorem 
Let  denote the evolution operator in the interaction picture.

 

Note that when applied to, say, the ground-state, the theorem does not guarantee that the evolved state will be a ground state. In other words, level crossing is not excluded.

Proof 

As in the original paper, the theorem is typically proved making use of Dyson's expansion of the evolution operator. Its validity however extends beyond the scope of perturbation theory as has been demonstrated by Molinari. We follow Molinari's method here. From Schrödinger's equation for the time-evolution operator 

 

and the boundary condition  we can formally write

 

Focus for the moment on the case . Through a change of variables  we can write 

 

We therefore have that

 

This result can be combined with the Schrödinger equation and its adjoint

 

to obtain 

 

 

The other case we are interested in, namely  can be treated in an analogous fashion
and yields an additional minus sign in front of the commutator (we are not concerned here with the case where
 have mixed signs). In summary, we obtain

 

We proceed for the negative-times case. Abbreviating the various operators for clarity 

 

Now using the definition of  we differentiate and eliminate derivatives  using the above expression, finding

 

where .

References 

 A.L. Fetter and J.D. Walecka: "Quantum Theory of Many-Particle Systems", McGraw–Hill (1971)

Quantum field theory
Theorems in quantum mechanics